Ramiro Romero Ortíz (born 26 January 1970) is a retired Mexican footballer and manager. He played for Cruz Azul, UAT and Toros Neza. As an international player, he was part of the Mexican squad at the 1987 FIFA U-16 World Championship and the 1991 Pan American Games.

Currently, he is an assistant to Carlos Reinoso Jr. in Albinegros de Orizaba.

Club career
Ramiro Romero was born in Tuxpan, Mexico on 26 January 1970. He made his professional debut with Cruz Azul in the 1988–89 season, playing 23 games and scoring two goals.

He would also play for Correcaminos UAT from 1994 to 1995, and Toros Neza from 1995 to 1998.

International career
Romero was part of Mexico's squad at the 1987 FIFA U-16 World Championship, where he played two matches and scored one goal, against Bolivia.

He also participated in the 1991 Pan American Games, where the Mexican team won the silver medal.

Managerial career
Romero started his managerial career with Inter Playa del Carmen in 2010. After that, he managed third division club Cocodrilos FC Lázaro Cárdenas with a record of 23 wins, 4 draws and 7 losses.

In 2018, he joined Albinegros de Orizaba as an assistant for Carlos Reinoso Jr.

References

1970 births
Living people
Mexican footballers
Mexico youth international footballers
Mexico international footballers
Liga MX players
Association football forwards
Footballers from Veracruz
Cruz Azul footballers
Correcaminos UAT footballers
Toros Neza footballers
Mexican football managers